The Campeonato Argentino de Rugby 1978 was won by the selection of Buenos Aires that beat in the final the selection of Unión de Rugby de Rosario

Rugby Union in Argentina in 1978

National
 The selection of Buenos Aires won also the "Campeonato Juvenil" (under-19)
 The Buenos Aires Champsionship was won by San Isidro Club
 The Cordoba Province Championship was won by La Tablada
 The North-East Championship was won by Tucumán RC

International
 1978 is an important year for Argentine rugby : the "Pumas" made a tour in Europe. They obtain an historical draw with England, beat Wales "B" and  Leinster. But in the end they lost surprising with Italy

Results

Zone 1

Zone 2

Zone 3

Zone 4

Interzone

Semifinals

Final
 Score system: Try= 4 points, Conversion=2 points .Penalty and kick from mark= 3 points. Drop= 3 points. 

 Rosario: 15.D. Baetti (M. Dip), 14.A. Nogués, 13.R. Rodríguez, 12.G. Torno, 11.C. Bisio, 10.J. Escalante, 9.R. Castagna, 8.D. Poet, 7.R. Seaton , 6. Risler (cap.), 5. C. Svetaz, 4.G. Sinópoli, 3. F. Semino (F. Rodríguez), 2. V. Macat, 1. R. Imhoff,
 Buenos Aires: 15.M. Sanzot, 14.M. Campo, 13.R. Madero, 12.J. Trueco, 11.A. Puccio, 10.H. Porta (cap.), 9. R. Landajo, 8.T. Petersen, 7.C. Serrano, 6.H. Silva, 5.S. Iachetti, 4.G. Travaglini, 3.H. Nicola, 2.A. Cubelli, 1.A. Cerioni.

External links 
 Memorias de la UAR 1978
 Francesco Volpe, Paolo Pacitti (Author), Rugby 2000, GTE Gruppo Editorale (1999)

Campeonato Argentino de Rugby
Argentina
Rugby